Kakuzi PLC is a Kenyan agricultural cultivation and manufacture company. Its products include avocados (of which it has been Kenya's largest exporter),  blueberries, macadamia, tea, livestock and commercial forestry.  Its subsidiaries include Estates Services Limited. Kakuzi's majority shareholder is the British company Camellia.

History

The Sisal Venture

The history of Kakuzi dates back to the colonial period with the arrival of Mr. Donald Farquharson Seth-Smith in British East Africa in 1906. A graduate of Oxford, he was a distinguished athlete, and upon arrival in Kenya, he set up his agricultural venture. In 1907, Donald, together with Mr.  Mervyn Ridley and Lord Cranworth they bought land (10117 ha) in Makuyu where they established their agribusiness venture. The farm was run by Mervyn and Donald who experimented with different crops before settling on sisal. They named the estate Sisal Ltd  and with increased demand for sisal, the business flourished.

The Coffee & Tea Venture

Kakuzi Fiberlands limited was incorporated in 1919, with interests in sisal and Coffee. It neighboured Sisal Limited and during this time, Sisal limited diversified its portfolio to include tea which was grown in Nandi Hills. This prompted Kakuzi, then majority-owned by Eastern Produce to acquire Siret Tea Estate in 1948.

Merger

The two firms merged in 1966 to form Kakuzi Plc. In 1987 sisal production ceased owing to increased competition from synthetic fibers. The focus was therefore shifted towards other crops.  Following a significant drought in 1984, the coffee plantations started to show symptoms of a serious fungal disease, Fusarium, which had been imported from poorly run neighbouring estates. New planting was not an option as this became infected as well and diversification into other crops resulted. Avocados were particularly viable and planted in large areas. Another diversification, on land unsuitable for more valuable crops, is forestry. Planting started in 1992, and by the end of 2010, some 1242 Hectares had been planted.  Cattle were a further diversification during the 1980s, when the size of the herd peaked at 7,500. As of August 2011, the herd was 4,407.

Acquisition by Camellia
As early as 1948, interests in Kenya's agricultural industry had gained shape. Eastern Produce acquired tea estates in Nandi (Siret Tea Estate). Camellia acquired majority interests in Eastern Produce limited which had interests in Kenya and Malawi. By 1990, Camellia had majority interests in Kakuzi through its subsidiaries; Eastern Produce Plc (34.19%) and Lawrie Group Plc (7.53%). In 1991, Linton Park Plc acquired Eastern Produce and further increased their holdings to 42.83%. By 1994 Linton Park, a subsidiary of Camellia held 50.1% of the outstanding shares. Currently, the stake is held by two subsidiaries; Bordue Ltd (26.06%) and Lintak Investments Ltd. (24.64%). Notably, the largest individual shareholder is Mr. John Kibunga Kimani with a 32.20% stake. He is also a Non-Executive Director effective November 1st 2020.

Controversies and Accusations of Human Rights Violations 
In 2017, a group of Kenyans petitioned Kenya's National Land Commission, claiming that colonialists had forced them off present-day Kakuzi land, confiscated their animals and left them destitute. More local community groups have since joined the petition in laying claim to the company's land.

In February 2019, avocado farmers in Murang'a county threatened to take court action against Kakuzi, accusing the company of breaching an avocado supply contract and not paying them in full.

In October 2020, the law firm Leigh Day said it had initiated legal action against UK firm Camellia, the parent of Kakuzi, on behalf of 79 Kenyans who accused Kakuzi's security guards of perpetrating abuses since 2009 including killings, rape, attacks and false imprisonment. Following these allegations, UK's supermarket chain Tesco announced that it had suspended avocado supply from Kakuzi Kenya due to the abuse claims.  Two more large European supermarket chains, Sainsbury's and Lidl, later confirmed that they had suspended deals with Kakuzi.  In February 2021, Camellia settled the court case for £4.6 million (Kes 696 million). The sum included compensation, legal costs and funding schemes for the community. However, the company did not issue an apology.

In June 2021, two additional women came forward with new allegations that they were raped by security guards at Kakuzi farm.

On August 03, Kenya’s Capital Market Authority questioned the CEO and CFO of Kakuzi over allegations of tax evasion through transfer pricing and conflict of interest by its majority shareholder.

Human Rights Measures
Following the levelling of unsubstantiated allegations, Kakuzi Plc has been actively working to address stakeholder concerns earlier raised, including with the assistance of leading human rights advisers. The company has already received positive feedback from the Ethical Trade Initiative.  In August 2021, Kakuzi PLC became the first corporate organization in Sub-Saharan Africa to constitute and establish an Independent Human Rights Advisory Committee (IHRAC) to be chaired by Kenya’s former Attorney General Prof Githu Muigai.

References

Agriculture companies of Kenya
Companies based in Nairobi